Alaaddin Mosque is a historical mosque in Sinop City, Sinop Province, Turkey.

Geography
The mosque is in Sinop. The mosque has been built  in the center of the Sinop peninsula. Another  historical  building,  the Pervane Medrese is to the north of the mosque.

History
Sinop was an important Black Sea port during the Middle Ages.  It was captured by Kaykaus I of Seljuks in 1214. The mosque was commissioned by his brother Alaattin Keykubat I in 1220s. The trustee of the mosque building was Atabeg Esedüddin Ayas, the former Artuqid (an Anatolian beylik) bey, who escaped from his  beylik after a coup d'état and took refuge in Seljuks. But after Manuel I of Trebizond captured Sinop, most of the mosque was demolished . Turkish control was restored in 1264 and Seljuks vizier Pervâne rebuilt the mosque in 1267. The city fell to Candarid beylik and in 1340s İbrahim of Candarids built a tomb in the north east corner of the mosque yard. In 1385 Bayezit of Candarids enlarged the mosque.  Sinop as well as the rest of Candarid lands were captured by the Ottoman Empire in 1460s. During the Ottoman rule several times the mosque  underwent maintenance. In 1850s  Tufan Pasha, the Ottoman governor of Sinop restored the mosque following an earthquake which damaged the dome. The last restoration of the mosque took place in 2008.

Building
The total area of the mosque is square where the building has  66 x 22 m2 (216 x 72 ft2) base area and the yard has  66 x 44 m2 (216 x 144 ft2) area. The rectangular plan of the mosque building is quite different from later Ottoman mosques. There are three gates; at the west, at the north and at the east. Shadirvan, the ablution fountain (a must for a mosque) is in the center of the yard. The mosque has three main domes and two smaller domes. During the restoration in the 1860s, the original marble mimbar of the mosque had been sent to Istanbul. The present wooden mimbar is a later addition.

References

Buildings and structures in Sinop, Turkey
Mosques in Turkey
Religious buildings and structures completed in the 1220s
Tourist attractions in Sinop, Turkey
Seljuk mosques in Turkey
13th-century mosques